The Vovinam World Championships, also known as the World Vo Vietnam Championships, are the highest level of competition for Vovinam organized by the World Vovinam Federation (WVVF).


List of world championships

Source:

All-time medal table
The following reflects the all-time medal counts as of the 2017 World Vovinam Championships:

References 

Sporting events in Vietnam
Martial arts in Vietnam